Timsbury may refer to:
Timsbury, Hampshire, England
Timsbury, Somerset, England